The 2011 Lenoir–Rhyne Bears football team represented Lenoir–Rhyne University in the 2011 NCAA Division II football season. The Bears offense scored 336 points while the defense allowed 226 points.

Schedule

References

Lenoir-Rhyne
Lenoir–Rhyne Bears football seasons
South Atlantic Conference football champion seasons
Lenoir-Rhyne Bears football